"Doughnut" is a song recorded by South Korean girl group Twice. It is the group's ninth Japanese maxi single, featuring three other tracks. It was pre-released for digital download and streaming on December 3, 2021, by Warner Music Japan as a single from their  Japanese full-length album, Celebrate. The single and its B-side, "Wonderful Day", were physically released on December 15 in Japan.

Background 
On October 15, 2021, shortly after the release of their first English single, "The Feels", and the announcement of their third Korean studio album (sixth overall), Formula of Love: O+T=<3, Twice's agency JYP Entertainment announced through a winter-themed teaser that the group will be releasing their ninth Japanese single, "Doughnut", on December 15.

Promotion 
To promote "Doughnut", Twice performed the song on the Japanese television show Music Station.

Track listing

Credits and personnel 
Credits adapted from CD single liner notes.

 Twice – lead vocals, background vocals
 Lauren Kaori – lyricist (on "Doughnut")
 Alexis Kesselman – composer, vocal producer (on "Doughnut")
 Woo S. Rhee "Rainstone" – composer, producer, all instruments, recording engineer, vocal director, digital editor (on "Doughnut")
 Francis – composer, co-producer, all instruments, recording engineer, digital editor (on "Doughnut")
 Fingazz – composer, co-producer, all instruments, recording engineer (on "Doughnut")
 JuHyeon Jun – strings arranger (on "Doughnut")
 Kate – background vocals (on "Doughnut")
 Dante Kim – assistant recording engineer (on "Doughnut")
 Kobee – vocal director (on "Doughnut")
 Choi Hyejin – recording engineer
 KayOne Lee – digital editor (on "Doughnut")
 Tony Maserati – mixer (on "Doughnut")
 David K. Younghyun – mixing engineer (on "Doughnut")
 Chris Gehringer – mastering engineer (on "Doughnut")
 Shoko Fujibayashi – lyricist (on "Wonderful Day")
 Andrew Choi – composer, all instruments (on "Wonderful Day")
 minGtion – composer, arranger, vocal director, digital editor (on "Wonderful Day")
 Emily Yeonseo Kim – composer (on "Wonderful Day")
 Elley – background vocals (on "Wonderful Day")
 Lee Sangyeop – recording engineer (on "Wonderful Day")
 Lim Hongjin –  mixer (on "Wonderful Day")
 Kwon Namwoo – mastering engineer (on "Wonderful Day")

Charts

Weekly charts

Year-end charts

Certifications

Release history

References 

2021 singles
2021 songs
Japanese-language songs
Twice (group) songs